Calosoma masaicus is a species of ground beetle in the subfamily of Carabinae. It was described by Alluaud in 1912.

References

masaicus
Beetles described in 1912